Francis Henry FitzHardinge Berkeley (7 December 1794 – 10 March 1870) was a British politician.

Background and education
Berkeley was the fourth son of Frederick Berkeley, 5th Earl of Berkeley, and Mary, daughter of William Cole. The validity of his parents' marriage was the subject of some controversy, and in 1811 the House of Lords decided that Berkeley and six of his twelve siblings were born out of wedlock. His brothers included William Berkeley, 1st Earl FitzHardinge, Maurice Berkeley, 1st Baron FitzHardinge, Grantley Berkeley and Craven Berkeley. He was educated at Christ Church, Oxford.

Political career
Berkeley was returned to Parliament as one of two representatives for Bristol in 1837, a seat he held until his death in 1870. He was a longstanding advocate of secret ballot reform, which was finally adopted after his death in 1872.

Personal life
Berkeley died in March 1870, aged 75; his body is buried in St Dunstan's churchyard in Cranford.

References

External links 
 

1794 births
1870 deaths
Younger sons of earls
Liberal Party (UK) MPs for English constituencies
UK MPs 1837–1841
UK MPs 1841–1847
UK MPs 1847–1852
UK MPs 1852–1857
UK MPs 1857–1859
UK MPs 1859–1865
UK MPs 1865–1868
UK MPs 1868–1874
Alumni of Christ Church, Oxford
Henry